Kappa Phi Kappa is a professional fraternity for students in Education. It was organized in 1922 at Dartmouth College. It currently has one remaining active chapter, at Ohio State University.

History

Kappa Phi Kappa was founded at Dartmouth as a Men's Professional Fraternity in 1922. It was incorporated on April 25, 1922, in New Hampshire. Its Founders were:

Unlike other fraternities, the incorporation of the national body preceded the organization of local chapters.  is celebrated as Founders' Day as it was on that day that the first meeting to work out the detailed plans for the organization was held.

The Ohio State University chapter of Kappa Phi Kappa originated as a chapter of Sigma Delta Sigma, a fraternity with similar aims which brought two chapters into Kappa Phi Kappa with a 1928 merger. The Alpha Eta chapter at Ohio State remains the only active chapter of Kappa Phi Kappa. 

In , the Executive Board of Kappa Phi Kappa invited representatives from six institutions together to form Kappa Delta Epsilon, a Women's Professional Sorority supporting the field of Education.  

By , Kappa Phi Kappa had 37 active chapters, with 28 inactive, for a total of 65 chapters installed. By , it had 40 active chapters, 28 inactive.

Membership
Membership was originally limited to white male students who took courses in the Department of Education including graduate students and faculty. Provision was made for alumni and honorary membership. It admitted members belonging to undergraduate Greek Letter Fraternities and did not bar members from belonging to honorary or graduate organizations.

By  (perhaps long before), membership had been open to all races, and the fraternity was similarly open to both genders.

Magazine
The general distribution magazine for Kappa Phi Kappa was the "Open Book Magazine of Kappa Phi Kappa" and was published quarterly. Additionally, the house organ "Closed Book" is circulated only among undergraduate members.

Insignia
The badge is in the form of a key displaying an open book in dull gold with the letters ΚΦΚ in black enamel in relief across the pages of the book. The colors of the fraternity are Green and white, the flower is the white carnation.

Chapters 
Chapters include the following: (Note, Omega chapter is a chapter-at-large for those people who become members but are not affiliated with an individual college campus)

References

External links 
 

Student organizations established in 1922
Professional fraternities and sororities in the United States
Former members of Professional Fraternity Association
1922 establishments in New Hampshire